The Bangladesh Islami Front is a far-right Islamic political party in Bangladesh. In the 2001 parliamentary election, the party fielded 16 candidates. Together they gathered 29,002 votes (0.05% of the national vote), but the party won no seats in the Jatiya Sangsad. The party's student wing is Bangladesh Islami Chattra Sena.

History
The party was founded on 21 December 1990.

Alliance
Bangladesh Islami Front entered into the Jatiya Party-led Sammilita Jatiya Jote (United National Alliance) in 2017.

Death of one of its Prominent Presidium Member
On 27 August 2014, Nurul Islam Farooqi, who was a presidium member of Islami Front, was murdered following an invasion of his home. In August, 2014, Islami Chhatra Sena chief Muhammad Nurul Haq Chisty announced at a press meeting that a half-day strike across Bangladesh would be observed, and demanded for the arrest and trial of Farooqi's killer.
The student party formed a human chain on the Dhaka-Sylhet Highway's Ashuganj Goalchattor area on 25 August 2015, demanding an exceptional punishment for Farooqi's killer.

References

Islamic political parties in Bangladesh
Islamic organizations established in 1990
Far-right politics in Bangladesh